Saylau Serikov was the Deputy Minister of Internal Affairs of Kazakh Soviet Socialist Republic. He was killed in the 1991 Azerbaijani Mil Mi-8 shootdown.

Life 
Saylau Serikov was born on December 24, 1940, in Karasay village of Kostanay Region, Kazakhstan SSR. 

He started working in the police in 1964. He started working as a policeman in the Frunze district of Almaty and was promoted to the position of commander of the police division. In 1970, he was promoted to Deputy Chief of the Leninsky District Police Department in Almaty, and in 1974 to the post of Chief. 

In 1985, Saylau Serikov was appointed Deputy Minister of Internal Affairs of the Kazakh SSR. At that time, he was a police lieutenant colonel.

Death 
Serikov was killed in 1991 when the helicopter he was travelling in was shot down near Karakend, Azerbaijan. He and many other government officials also on board were on their way to discuss the conflict with local Armenian representatives. All 22 people on board were killed.

He was buried in Almaty. One of the streets in Almaty is named after him.

Awards 
In 1977, he was awarded the Order of the Red Banner of Labour.

References

1940 births
1991 deaths
Political office-holders in Kazakhstan
People from Kostanay Region
Victims of aircraft shootdowns